Wui Hye-deok (Hangul: 위혜덕) is a former director of Korea Football Association.

External links
 All-time Executives at KFA

Year of birth missing (living people)
Place of birth missing (living people)
Living people
Football people in South Korea